Street unicycling is one of the latest developments in unicycling. The aim of the sport is to use natural/urban/specially made obstacles such as ledges, handrails and stairs in a given area to perform tricks that look good. The emphasis falls on technical proficiency, style and creativity. Street unicycling draws inspiration from skateboarding and bmx bike riding, with many similar tricks.

For street unicycling, most riders prefer to ride 20" trials unicycles because of their light weight, good hopping abilities, smooth maneuverability. However, some riders prefer using the less conventional 24" and 26" wheel sizes for street riding.

Competition street unicycling

The 13th Unicycle World Championships (Jul/Aug 2006) played host to the first ever "official" Street Freestyle Competition, while the first ever street competition was truly at the California Mountain Unicycle Weekend in 2004 (http://www.unicycling.com/muni/2004/). Xavier Collos (France) clinched the world title. Unicycling competitions incorporating street aspects are now more commonplace.

The 19th Unicycle World Championships were held in Ansan, Korea in 2018.

See also 
 Extreme unicycling
 Mountain unicycling
 Unicycle trials
 Unicycle
 Unicycling

Unicycling
Unicycling